Halolaguna guizhouensis is a moth in the family Lecithoceridae. It is found in China (Chongqing, Guangdong, Guangxi, Guizhou).

The wingspan is 14–15 mm.

References

Moths described in 2012
Halolaguna